Osborne House may refer to:

Australia
 Osborne House (Geelong), a historic building built in 1858, located in North Geelong, Victoria
 Osborne House, Millers Point, a heritage-listed house in Sydney, New South Wales

United Kingdom
Osborne House, a former royal residence in East Cowes, Isle of Wight

United States
Osborne House (Victor, New York), a historic home located at Victor in Ontario County, New York
Edmund B. Osborne House, a historic residence located in Red Oak, Iowa
Jessie Osborne House, near Jerome, Idaho, listed on the National Register of Historic Places in 1983
John Osborne House, a historic house at 909 King's Highway West in Fairfield, Connecticut
Prince Osborne House, a historic First Period house at 273 Maple Street in Danvers, Massachusetts

See also
Osborn House, a historic house at 456 Rock Street in Fall River, Massachusetts